Kenneth Dawson Bagshawe  (17 August 1925 – 27 December 2022) was a British oncologist, and Emeritus Professor of Medical Oncology, at Charing Cross Hospital.

Bagshawe worked at St Mary's Hospital Medical School from 1946 to 1952, and subsequently became a Research Fellow at Johns Hopkins Hospital, in Baltimore, United States, in 1955.

From 1960, he was Senior Lecturer in Medicine at Charing Cross Hospital Medical School, and Professor of Medical Oncology there (from 1975 to 1990).

Bagshawe served as chair of the Cancer Research Campaign's Scientific Committee (from 1983 to 1988).

Bagshawe was elected a Fellow of the Royal Society (FRS) in 1989, and was appointed Commander of the Order of the British Empire (CBE) in the 1990 Birthday Honours.

Bagshawe died in Paddington, London on 27 December 2022, at the age of 97.

Works
Choriocarcinoma: the clinical biology of the trophoblast and its tumours, Edward Arnold, 1969
(editor) Medical oncology: medical aspects of malignant disease, Blackwell Scientific Publications, 1975, 
(editor) VP-16: recent advances and future prospects Grune & Stratton, 1985

References

External links
 
 https://web.archive.org/web/20170118222001/https://www.labome.org/expert/uk/bagshawe/kenneth-d-bagshawe-943493.html
 

1925 births
2022 deaths
British medical researchers
British oncologists
Commanders of the Order of the British Empire
Fellows of the Royal Society